The Adeona or Adeonian family is a large asteroid family that formed from the parent body 145 Adeona. Its spectral type is that of a carbonaceous C-type, with currently 2,236 asteroids identified as family members. Based upon simulation studies, the Adeonian family is believed to be no more than 600 million years old, compared to a typical asteroid family age of 1–2 billion years.

References 
 

Asteroid groups and families